April Mann (born 21 April 1978) is an Australian retired soccer player.

Mann played for Queensland Sting and Western Waves in the Australian Women's National Soccer League, and Adelaide United in the Australian W-League.

Mann made 28 appearances for Australia between 2001 and 2004, including two matches at the 2003 FIFA Women's World Cup.

References 

1978 births
Living people
Australian women's soccer players
Adelaide United FC (A-League Women) players
A-League Women players
Australia women's international soccer players
2003 FIFA Women's World Cup players
Women's association football midfielders